The discography of Tupac Shakur, an American rapper, consists of 11 studio albums. Throughout his career, Shakur has sold 74 million records worldwide. He has scored 5 No. 1 albums on Billboard 200 and 8 No. 1 albums on Top R&B/Hip-Hop albums. In 2001, Guinness World Records hailed him as the then Best-selling artist of rap in the US. According to Recording Industry Association of America, he has sold 55.3 million albums and an additional 4 million under his alias Makaveli with "The Don Killuminati", making him the second best-selling hip-hop artist in history.

Four were released before Shakur's death on September 13, 1996, and seven were posthumously released, the first being The Don Killuminati: The 7 Day Theory, released on November 5, 1996 (although the album was finished before Shakur's death).

Albums

Studio albums

Posthumous albums

Live albums

Compilation albums

Remix albums

Soundtrack albums

Video albums

Singles

As lead artist

As featured artist

Other charted and certified songs

Guest appearances

Music videos

As lead artist

As featured artist

See also
 Outlawz discography

Notes

References

External links
 2Pac at AllMusic
 
 

Hip hop discographies
Tupac Shakur
Discographies of American artists

sr:Тупак Шакур#Албуми